The 2020–21 Southern Combination Football League season was the 96th in the history of the competition, which lies at levels 9 and 10 of the English football league system. This season also marked 100 years since the league was first formed, with Eastbourne Town, Newhaven and Shoreham being the only teams still in the league to have played in the first season.

The club allocations for Steps 5 and 6 were announced by The Football Association (The FA) for the 2020–21 season on 21 July 2020 and remained unchanged after the 2019–20 season was abandoned on 26 March due to the coronavirus pandemic.

On 18 July 2020 the FA released a statement that football would provisionally start on 5 September subject to spectators being able to watch games. With the FA Cup qualifying rounds starting from 1 September as midweek games to bring it in line with a November start for the First Round proper. The League Cup and the Sussex RUR Cup were cancelled this season with the main focus being the league season completed. Only the Sussex Senior Challenge Cup was to be played during the season.

Covid–19 impact
The season was briefly paused between Thursday 5 November and 2 December 2020 as the UK Government imposed a four-week lockdown on non-elite sports across England. With the lockdown ending the Counties of Sussex and Surrey were placed in Tier 2 and clubs held a vote with the league whether to recommence the season. The league restarted with Division Two recommencing on Saturday 5 December and the Premier and Division One recommencing on Tuesday 8 December.

On Saturday 20 December, the UK Government announced that parts of the Sussex and Surrey would be placed in a new Tier 4. With Alfold, Bexhill United and Horley Town being in that tier, players and fans living in the Tier 4 area were not allowed to travel; the SCFL decided to again pause the season on 22 December with a review whether to re-start the season on 9 January 2021 which later resulted in a suspension until further notice.

On 24 February 2021, the FA Alliance and Leagues committees announced that the 2020–21 would be curtailed, subject to ratification by The FA, with immediate effect.

On 18 March, the Southern Combination League committee announced a supplementary cup competition to provide competitive football for their teams. Premier and Division One teams started on 10 April with Division Two teams kicked off earlier, on 3 April. The winners of each group then entered a semi-final and the final was played on or after 17 May.

Promotion, relegation and restructuring
The scheduled restructuring of non-League football took place at the end of the season. Promotions from Steps 5 to 4 and 6 to 5 were based on points per game across all matches over the two abandoned seasons (2019–20 and 2020–21), while teams were promoted to Step 6 on the basis of a subjective application process.

Premier Division

The Premier Division consisted of 20 clubs, the same as last season.

Premier Division table at time of curtailment

Results table

Results by matchday

Position by matchday

Top scorers
Correct as of 24 February 2021

Stadia and locations

Division One

Division One was reduced from 18 clubs to 16 after Sidlesham resigned during the previous season and Southwick were demoted into the Mid Sussex Football League.

Division One table at time of curtailment

Results table

Results by matchday

Top scorers
Correct until 24 February 2021

Stadia and locations

Division Two

Division Two was reduced from 15 teams to 14 after Cowfold resigned from the league last season and Angmering Village transferred to the West Sussex Football League and featured one new club:
 Charlwood, transferred from the Mid Sussex Football League

Promotion from this division depended on ground grading as well as league position.

League table

Results table

Results by matchday

Top scorers

Stadia and locations

Supplementry Shield

Premier Division

Group A

Group B

Group C

Group D

semi-final

Final

Division One

Group A

Group B

Group C

semi-final

Final

Division Two

Group A

Group B

semi-final

Final

References

External links
 Southern Combination Football League

2020-21
9
Southern Combination Football League, 2020-21